The straight-billed woodcreeper (Dendroplex picus) is a species of bird in the woodcreeper subfamily Dendrocolaptinae that is widely distributed in northeastern South America. Its genus, Dendroplex, is now considered to be distinct from Xiphorhynchus.

Taxonomy
The straight-billed woodcreeper was formally described in 1788 by the German naturalist Johann Friedrich Gmelin in his revised and expanded edition of Carl Linnaeus's Systema Naturae. He placed it with the orioles in the genus Oriolus and coined the binomial name Oriolus picus. The specific epithet picus is the Latin word for a woodpecker. Gmelin based his description on "Le pic-grimpereaux" from Cayenne that had been described and illustrated in 1780 by the French polymath, the Comte de Buffon. The straight-billed woodcreeper is now placed together with Zimmer's woodcreeper in the genus Dendroplex that was introduced in 1827 by William Swainson.

Thirteen subspecies are recognised.
 D. p. extimus Griscom, 1927 – central, east Panama and northwest Colombia
 D. p. dugandi Wetmore & Phelps, WH, 1946 – north Colombia
 D. p. picirostris Lafresnaye, 1847 – north Colombia and extreme northwest Venezuela
 D. p. saturatior Hellmayr, 1925 – east Colombia and west Venezuela
 D. p. choicus Wetmore & Phelps, WH, 1946 – north Venezuela
 D. p. paraguanae (Phelps, WH & Phelps, WH Jr, 1962) – northwest Venezuela
 D. p. longirostris Richmond, 1896 – Margarita Island (off Venezuela)
 D. p. altirostris (Leotaud, 1866) – Trinidad
 D. p. phalarus Wetmore, 1939 – central, north Venezuela
 D. p. deltanus (Phelps, WH & Phelps, WH Jr, 1952) – northeast Venezuela
 D. p. picus (Gmelin, JF, 1788) – east Venezuela, the Guianas and north, central, east Brazil
 D. p. duidae Zimmer, JT, 1934 – east Colombia, south Venezuela and northwest Brazil
 D. p. peruvianus Zimmer, JT, 1934 – east Peru, north, east Bolivia and southwest Brazil

Distribution and habitat
It is found in Bolivia, Brazil, Colombia, Ecuador, French Guiana, Guyana, Panama, Peru, Suriname, Trinidad and Tobago, and Venezuela.
Its natural habitats are subtropical or tropical dry forests, subtropical or tropical moist lowland forests, subtropical or tropical mangrove forests, and heavily degraded former forest.

The straight-billed woodcreeper's range is in central and north South America, east of the Andes cordillera, and encompasses the entire Amazon Basin and the Caatinga. The species is found in Panama of Central America, and only the four countries, Chile, Argentina, Paraguay and Uruguay, of southernmost South America are excluded from the South American range.

References

External links
Straight-billed woodcreeper videos on the Internet Bird Collection
Associação Mãe-da-lua Straight-billed woodcreeper Fotos, sounds, notes
Stamps (for Colombia)
Straight-billed woodcreeper photo gallery VIREO Photo-High Res

straight-billed woodcreeper
Birds of Panama
Birds of Colombia
Birds of Venezuela
Birds of Trinidad and Tobago
Birds of the Guianas
Birds of the Amazon Basin
Birds of Brazil
straight-billed woodcreeper
straight-billed woodcreeper
Taxonomy articles created by Polbot